Bindi's Bootcamp is an Australian children's game show television series aired on ABC3 on 7 July 2012 until 29 October 2015. It was hosted by Bindi Irwin, the daughter of Steve Irwin.

Set at Bindi Irwin's home, Australia Zoo, each episode sees three teams of two bootcampers have their knowledge, inner strength and stamina tested as they compete in wildlife-based challenges with the aim of making it into the Grand Final and being named 'Bindi's Wildlife Warriors'.

Challenges are grouped into several categories such as Gross Island, Dangerous Dash and Zoom Through The Zoo. Some challenges, such as "Whose Poo Is Who", were designed by Bindi's brother Robert.

In 2012, Bindi and Robert opened the Bootcamp Playground from the show as an attraction in Australia Zoo, including several challenges seen on the show.

See also

List of programs broadcast by Animal Planet

References

External links
 Official Website

Australian Broadcasting Corporation original programming
Australian children's television series
Australian children's game shows
2012 Australian television series debuts
2015 Australian television series endings
2010s Australian game shows
Television shows set in Queensland
Television series about teenagers
Television series by Fremantle (company)
Television series by FremantleMedia Kids & Family